Ricardo Mello won in the final 7–6(2), 6–4, against Juan Ignacio Chela.

Seeds

Draw

Final four

Top half

Bottom half

References
 Main Draw
 Qualifying Draw

Aberto de Brasilia - Singles
Aberto de Brasília